Christina is a lost 1929 part talkie starring Janet Gaynor and directed by William K. Howard. The supporting cast includes Charles Morton, Rudolph Schildkraut, Harry Cording, and Lucy Doraine. The film is lost, but surviving posters indicate that there was a talking soundtrack at some point.

Cast
Janet Gaynor as Christina
Charles Morton as Jan
Rudolph Schildkraut as Niklaas
Harry Cording as Dick Torpe
Lucy Doraine as Madame Bosman

References

External links
 
 

1929 films
1929 drama films
Fox Film films
American silent feature films
Films directed by William K. Howard
Silent American drama films
American black-and-white films
Lost American films
1929 lost films
Lost drama films
1920s English-language films
1920s American films